Mircea Immanuel Mustață (born 1971 in Romania) is a Romanian-American mathematician, specializing in algebraic geometry.

Mustață received from the University of Bucharest a bachelor's degree in 1995 and a master's degree in 1996 and from the University of California, Berkeley a PhD in 2001 with thesis advisor David Eisenbud and thesis Singularities and Jet Schemes. As a postdoc he was at the University of Nice Sophia Antipolis (Fall 2001), at the Isaac Newton Institute (Spring 2002), and at Harvard University (2002–2004); he was from 2001 to 2004 a Clay Research Fellow. At the University of Michigan in Ann Arbor he became in 2004 an associate professor and in 2008 a full professor.

In fall 2006, he was at the Institute for Advanced Study. From 2006 to 2011 he held a five-year Packard Fellowship.

Mustață was an invited speaker at the European Mathematical Congress in 2004 Stockholm and at the International Congress of Mathematicians in 2014 in Seoul.

His research deals with a wide range of topics in algebraic geometry, including:

Mustață's doctoral students include June Huh.

Selected publications

References

External links

21st-century Romanian mathematicians
21st-century American mathematicians
Algebraic geometers
University of Bucharest alumni
University of Michigan faculty
1971 births
Living people
University of California, Berkeley alumni
Romanian emigrants to the United States